Freddie O'Neal Robinson (born February 1, 1964) is a former professional American football defensive back in the National Football League (NFL). Robinson, who played college football for the Alabama Crimson Tide, was drafted by the Indianapolis Colts in the 6th round (142nd overall selection) of the 1987 NFL Draft. He would play two seasons for the Colts (1987-1988)

References

1964 births
Living people
Sportspeople from Mobile, Alabama
Players of American football from Alabama
American football safeties
Alabama Crimson Tide football players
Indianapolis Colts players